Balbardie Park of Peace Golf Course is a golf course located in Bathgate, West Lothian, Scotland.

Course
The 9 hole golf course, suited in Balbardie Park of Peace Xcite Bathgate, offers players an ideal course suitable for beginners as well experienced golfers.

References

External links

Golf clubs and courses in West Lothian
West Lothian